Jo's Greatest Hits was an album by Jo Stafford, released in 1958 by Columbia Records and featuring, as the name implies, a compilation of the singer's greatest hits.

Track listing

Side one
 "Jambalaya" (#3, 1957)
 "Keep It a Secret" (#4, 1952)
 "Teach Me Tonight" (#15, 1954)
 "It Is No Secret" (#15, 1951)
 "Hawaiian War Chant" (1951)
 "Tennessee Waltz" (#7, 1951)

Side two
 "You Belong to Me" (#1, 1952)
 "Make Love to Me!" (#1, 1954)
 "Shrimp Boats" (#2, 1951)
 "Stardust" (1950)
 "If" (#8, 1951)
 "If You've Got the Money, I've Got the Time" (#14, 1950)

References

1959 greatest hits albums
Columbia Records compilation albums
Albums arranged by Paul Weston
Jo Stafford compilation albums